Robert Hugh Buxton (1 July 1871 – c.1965)  was an English oil and watercolour painter and illustrator.

Life
Buxton was born in Harrowin 1871, Middlesex and studied at the Herkomer School of Art in Bushey, Hertfordshire, and at the Slade School of Fine Art, London. He lived in London, exhibiting in the capital at the Royal Academy, the Royal Institute of Painters in Water Colours, the Royal Institute of Oil Painters), and the Fine Art Society. He also exhibited in the regions and at the Paris Salon in France.

Buxton mainly painted landscapes, dogs and hunting scenes. His painting Martin on 'Mulberry' with 'Bill''' is in the Bushey Museum and Art Gallery. He died probably around May 1965, his exact date of death is unknown.

References

Publications
Illustrated books:
Fisher, Arthur O. Withyford: an Exmoor story (Chatto & Windus, 1908).
Dawson, A. J. Finn the Wolfhound (London: Grant Richards, 1908)
Bradley, A. G. A book of the Severn'' (New York: Dodd, Mead & Co., 1920).

External links and references
 R H Buxton (thistlefineart.com)
 Fox hunting scene (prices4antiques.com)
 

19th-century English painters
English male painters
20th-century English painters
English illustrators
Landscape artists
English watercolourists
Animal artists
Alumni of the Slade School of Fine Art
People from Harrow, London
Year of death missing
1871 births
20th-century English male artists
19th-century English male artists